Warnant may refer to:

Warnant, Namur, a district of the municipality of Anhée, Namur, Wallonia, Belgium
Warnant-Dreye, also called "Warnant", a district in the municipality of Villers-le-Bouillet, Liège, Wallonia, Belgium

See also
 Warrant (disambiguation)

fr:Warnant